Ilino (Cyrillic: Илино) is a village in the municipality of Goražde, Bosnia and Herzegovina.

Demographics 
According to the 2013 census, its population was 2, both Bosniaks.

References

Populated places in Goražde
Serb communities in the Federation of Bosnia and Herzegovina